The Texas High Plains AVA is an American Viticultural Area located on the Llano Estacado region of Texas. The Texas plains can be extremely dry, so most vineyards are irrigated with water from the Ogallala Aquifer. The hardiness zones are 7a and 7b.

Wineries
There are at least six wineries located within the Texas High Plains AVA, although many wineries outside of the AVA source grapes from the high plains including Caprock Winery (the first publicly held Winery in the state) and Llano Estacado Winery.

See also
 Texas wine

References

American Viticultural Areas
Geography of Texas
Texas wine
Economy of Lubbock, Texas
1993 establishments in Texas